The Brigada de Reacção Rápida (Rapid Reaction Brigade) is a unit of the Portuguese Army which was known as BAI - Brigada Aerotransportada Independente (Independent Airborne Brigade) until 2006. Its different units are highly trained Paratroopers, Commandos and Special Operations Troops capable of responding to threats in any part of continental Portugal or any other Portuguese overseas territory with quick deployment by air, sea or land (with the support of the Air Force and/or the Navy when required).  This brigade is the most requested by the Portuguese Government to fulfill international assignments due to its experience and multi-role capability.

The economic crisis forced the Portuguese Government to make budget cuts in the Armed Forces, and in June 2012 it was announced that the Portuguese Army was no longer going to receive the 10 NH-90 transport helicopters that would incorporate the Unidade de Aviação Ligeira do Exército (Army Light Aviation Unit). Thus, the Rapid Reaction Brigade still maintains its dependency on the Air Force for aerial transportation.

History 

In 1993, the Corpo de Tropas Aerotransportadas (Airborne Troops Corps), which was part of the Portuguese Air Force was disbanded and the Portuguese airborne forces were transferred to the Army.  A new brigade was then created, the Independent Airborne Brigade (BAI) which included all airborne-capable forces in it.  The Army also transferred to this brigade some heavier weapons like howitzers, thus giving the unit increased firepower, as well as creating an operational command named Comando de Tropas Aerotransportadas (Airborne Troops Command).
The Comandos Regiment was disbanded and the Comandos that had the Parachute Course were transferred to the new brigade.  For more than 10 years the BAI kept serving the country in international missions, sending Paratroopers to several locations in Europe and East-Timor. In 2002 the Comandos were reactivated as an independent unit and were separated from the Paratroopers.

In 2006, a reorganization in the Portuguese Army occurred, renaming the brigade as Brigada de Reacção Rápida (Rapid Reaction Brigade) and adding special forces to it. These units were the Comandos and the Rangers, increasing the brigade-size with two Comando companies and the Special Operations Forces but losing the 3rd Paratrooper Infantry Battalion (disbanded).  Also, this reformation had its costs since the 155mm howitzers were transferred to the Portuguese Intervention Brigade (thus losing its airborne capability) and the Airborne Troops Command was disbanded, putting the unit under the orders of the Comando Operacional de Forças Terrestres (Land Forces Operational Command) losing its autonomy from the rest of the Army.

Organization 
The brigade's operational units are listed below. Under the Portuguese system regiments and centres are responsible for the training, maintenance, and sustainment of the operational units, but are not operational units themselves. I.e. the 15th Infantry Regiment trains, maintains and sustains the 1st Paratroopers Infantry Battalion, but itself is not an operational unit and not part of the brigade during wartime.

 Rapid Reaction Brigade (Brigada de Reação Rápida), in Tancos
 Command and Service Company, Paratroopers Regiment (Regimento de Paraquedistas), in Tancos
 Intelligence, Surveillance, Target Acquisition and Reconnaissance Group (AgrISTAR), 3rd Cavalry Regiment (Regimento de Cavalaria Nº 3) in Estremoz
 1st Paratroopers Infantry Battalion, 15th Infantry Regiment (Regimento de Infantaria Nº 15), in Tomar
 2nd Paratroopers Infantry Battalion, 10th Infantry Regiment (Regimento de Infantaria Nº 10), in São Jacinto
 Airborne Operations Battalion, Paratroopers Regiment (Regimento de Paraquedistas), in Tancos
 Command and Services Company
 Pathfinder Company
 Air Supply Company
 Air Equipment Company
 K9 Platoon (Military working dogs)
 Commando Battalion, Commando Regiment (Regimento de Comandos) in Belas
 Special Operations Force, Special Operations Troops Centre (Centro de Tropas de Operações Especiais), in Lamego
 Field Artillery Group, 4th Artillery Regiment (Regimento de Artilharia Nº 4), in Leiria with L118 105mm howitzers
 Light Engineer Company, 1st Engineer Regiment (Regimento de Engenharia Nº 1), in Tancos
 Signal Company, Paratroopers Regiment (Regimento de Paraquedistas), in Tancos
 Permanent Light Service Support Nucleus (NPApSvcLig), in Entroncamento

Paratroopers 

The Paratroopers and elite infantry force and are the heaviest troops on the brigade acting as airborne light infantry, used for conventional conflicts, with emphasis on airborne assaults. Paratrooper battalions contain units with heavy weapons and light vehicles for quick assaults and raids. Paratroopers are instructed at the Parachute Troops School, in Tancos, central Portugal. 
 Paratrooper units: (the units are battalion sized, but retain the name regiment for historic reasons)
 10th Infantry Regiment (Regimento de Infantaria Nº10)
 15th Infantry Regiment (Regimento de Infantaria Nº15)

Special Operations Forces 

The Special Operations Forces are generally the first to arrive and the last to leave the operational area. They are the most autonomous unit of the brigade, able to infiltrate deep behind enemy lines. Not as heavily armed as the Commandos nor the Paratroopers, its units rely on stealth to complete their objectives. Since it is airborne-qualified it can be deployed by air, sea or land.

Special Operators are instructed at the Special Operations Troops Centre in Lamego, northern Portugal.

 Special Operations / CTOE - Special Operations Troops Center  (Centro Tropas Operações Especiais)

Comandos 

The Comandos are an elite light infantry unit capable of conducting several special operations missions, although they are mainly a rapid reaction force. They can be deployed by air, sea or land.

Commandos are instructed at the Commando Regiment, in Belas.

 Commando Regiment

Equipment

International assignments

Independent Airborne Brigade missions
As the ancestor of the Rapid Reaction Brigade, the Independent Airborne Brigade made several missions to several different countries mainly in peacekeeping operations. Paratrooper Battalions were sent to Bosnia, East-Timor and Kosovo.

Afghanistan 
After the creation of the brigade, the unit was sent to Afghanistan. An entire Commando company was sent to the area (western provinces), suffering the first KIA of the Portuguese Armed Forces since the end of the Portuguese Colonial War, during a daytime patrol. The KIA Comando was 1st Sergeant Roma Pereira, mortally hit when an IED detonated his Humvee.

The Comandos were replaced by a company of Paratroopers who suffered no casualties while performing the mission. This company was yet again replaced by a second company of Comandos.

Bosnia 
In the beginning of 2007, the Portuguese Defense Minister decided to end the mission in Bosnia due to the lack of need of a military presence in the area. All units from the Rapid Reaction Brigade and from the Portuguese Mechanized Brigade present in the region withdrew.

References

Rapid Reaction Brigade
Military units and formations established in 2006
Special forces of Portugal
Military of Portugal